Lace schools were common in Britain from the 17th to 19th century to teach lace-making.

Lace schools were often the living rooms of small cottages and were known for being overcrowded, badly lit and often unsanitary. Girls and some boys were put to work at the age of six or seven and spent long hours bent over their pillows, learning the craft, until they could produce a marketable product. Some of the children were also taught elementary reading, but there was little other general education.

External links

Lace